Theo Lingen (10 June 1903 – 10 November 1978), born Franz Theodor Schmitz, was a German actor, film director and screenwriter. He appeared in more than 230 films between 1929 and 1978, and directed 21 films between 1936 and 1960.

Life and career
Lingen was born the son of a lawyer in the city of Hanover, and grew up there. He attended the Royal Goethe Gymnasium – the predecessor of the Goethe School – in Hanover, but left before taking the Abitur (final exams). His theatrical talent was discovered during rehearsals for a school performance at the Schauburg boulevard theatre.

Beginning his professional stage career, the young actor adopted as a stage name his middle name together with that of the birthplace of his father, Lingen in the North German Emsland region. As "Theo Lingen" he performed at theatres at Hanover, Halberstadt, Münster and Frankfurt; in plays like The Importance of Being Earnest he very quickly earned a reputation as a superb character comedian, distinguished by his characteristic nasal speech. This distinction followed him when he began appearing in films in 1929, often together with the Viennese actor Hans Moser, since together they made a contrasting pair. In 1929 he was invited by Bertolt Brecht to the Theater am Schiffbauerdamm in Berlin, where he performed as Macheath in The Threepenny Opera. He starred in drama films like M and The Testament of Dr. Mabuse directed by Fritz Lang.

In February 1928, Lingen's daughter, Ursula, was born to Bertold Brecht's then wife Marianne Zoff (1893–1984). Brecht and Zoff divorced in September; Lingen and Zoff married later the same year, they also raised Zoff's elder daughter Hanne. Conditions worsened after the Machtergreifung of 30 January 1933: Because Zoff was of Jewish descent, which under the Nazi regime usually resulted in a professional disqualification (Berufsverbot), Lingen thought about going into exile. However, because of his great popularity with the general public he was given a special permit by Propaganda Minister Joseph Goebbels to continue to perform and was able to protect his wife from persecution. In 1936 Gustaf Gründgens placed Lingen at the ensemble of the Berlin Prussian State Theatre. He also directed films like Hauptsache glücklich (1941) starring Heinz Rühmann.

In 1944 Lingen moved to Vienna, and in view of the approaching Red Army retired to his cottage at Strobl on the Wolfgangsee shortly afterwards. Here for a few days in May 1945, he acted as de facto mayor, when he managed to disempower the local Nazi authorities and surrendered to the US Army at St. Gilgen. Lingen's measures were followed by the liberation of King Leopold III of Belgium and his wife by the 106th Cavalry Regiment.

After the war he became a naturalised Austrian citizen, and from 1948 worked as a character actor at the Vienna Burgtheater and appeared frequently onstage in Germany, most notably in Carl Sternheim satires directed by Rudolf Noelte. Foremost however he pursued his film career, performing in numerous comedies of varied quality, in his later days of the 1970s also on television, for example as a presenter for Laurel and Hardy films.

Theo Lingen died of cancer in 1978 at the age of 75 in Vienna. The city of Vienna dedicated a grave to him at the Zentralfriedhof. The municipalities of Strobl and Lingen (in 2007) have named squares in his honor.

Selected filmography

 Dolly Gets Ahead (1930) - Conny Coon
  (1930) - Charles
 Die große Sehnsucht (1930) - Self - Theo Lingen
 The Flute Concert of Sanssouci (1930) - Kent

 The Firm Gets Married (1931)
 M (1931) - Bauernfänger
 Man Equals Man (1931, documentary of stage production)
 No More Love (1931)
 My Wife, the Impostor (1931)
 Ronny (1931)
 You Don't Forget Such a Girl (1932)
 Two Heavenly Blue Eyes (1932)
 The Ladies Diplomat (1932)
 The Countess of Monte Cristo (1932)
 A Mad Idea (1932)
 The Escape to Nice (1932)
 Modern Dowry (1932)
 Gypsies of the Night (1932)
 Frederica (1932)
 The Testament of Cornelius Gulden (1932)
  (1932)
 Spell of the Looking Glass (1932)
 A City Upside Down (1933)
 The Big Bluff (1933)
 Marion, That's Not Nice (1933)
 And Who Is Kissing Me? (1933)
 Die kleine Schwindlerin (1933)
 The Peak Scaler (1933)
 The Testament of Dr. Mabuse (1933)
 Little Man, What Now? (1933)
 Love Must Be Understood (1933)
  (1933)
 Waltz War (1933)
 Little Girl, Great Fortune (1933)
 Höllentempo (1933)
 Zwei im Sonnenschein (1933)
 Ihre Durchlaucht, die Verkäuferin (1933)
 Das Lied vom Glück (1933)
  (1933)
 The Hunter from Kurpfalz (1933)
 The Grand Duke's Finances (1934)
 Konjunkturritter (1934)
 Ich kenn' dich nicht und liebe dich (1934)
 A Precocious Girl (1934)
 The Double (1934)
 Ein Mädel wirbelt durch die Welt (1934)
 My Heart Calls You (1934)
 The Flower Girl from the Grand Hotel (1934)
 ...heute abend bei mir (1934)
 Paganini (1934)
 Schön ist es, verliebt zu sein (1934)
  (1934)
 Liebe dumme Mama (1934)
 Spring Parade (1934)
  (1934)
 Ich sehne mich nach dir (1934)
  (1934)
  (1935)
 Die Katz' im Sack (1935)
 Winter Night's Dream (1935)
 Ein falscher Fuffziger (1935)
 Der Schlafwagenkontrolleur (1935)
 Heaven on Earth (1935)
 Held einer Nacht (1935)
 Ich liebe alle Frauen (1935)
 Das Einmaleins der Liebe (1935)
 The Valley of Love (1935)
 The White Horse Inn (1935)
 The Czar's Courier (1936)
 Ungeküsst soll man nicht schlafen gehn (1936)
  (1936)
 Thank You, Madame (1936)
 Der verkannte Lebemann (1936)
 Fräulein Veronika (1936)
 A Wedding Dream (1936)
 Die Leute mit dem Sonnenstich (1936)
 Es geht um mein Leben (1936)
 Premiere (1937)
  (1937)
 Dangerous Game (1937)
 Heiratsinstitut Ida & Co (1937)
 Die unentschuldigte Stunde (1937)
 Fremdenheim Filoda (1937)
 Die Austernlilli (1937)
 The Charm of La Boheme (1937)
 Die verschwundene Frau (1937)
 The Tiger of Eschnapur (1938)
 Immer wenn ich glücklich bin..! (1938)
 The Indian Tomb (1938)
  (1938)
 Diskretion – Ehrensache (1938)
 Der Optimist (1938)
 Dir gehört mein Herz (German-language version, 1938)
 The Stars Shine (1938) - Himself
 Marionette (Italian-language version, 1939)
 Dance on the Volcano (1938)
 Drunter und drüber (1939)
  (1939)
 Eine Frau für Drei (1939)
 Hochzeitsreise zu dritt (1939)
 Opera Ball (1939)
 Rote Mühle (1940)
 The Unfaithful Eckehart (1940)
  (1940)
 Was wird hier gespielt? (also director, 1940)
 The Girl from Barnhelm (1940)
 Herz – modern möbliert (also director, 1940)
 Roses in Tyrol (1940)
 Seven Years Hard Luck (1940)
 Happiness Is the Main Thing (director, 1941)
  (1941)
  (also director, 1941)
 Was geschah in dieser Nacht? (also director, 1941)
 Sonntagskinder (1941)
 Vienna Blood (1942)
 Seven Years of Good Luck (German-language version, 1942)
 Seven Years of Happiness (Italian-language version, 1943)
 Liebeskomödie (also director, 1943)
 Tolle Nacht (also director, 1943)
 Johann (1943)
 Das Lied der Nachtigall (also director, 1944)
 Es fing so harmlos an (also director, 1944)
 Renee XIV (1946, uncompleted)
 Hazugság nélkül (1946)
 Wiener Melodien (director, co-director: Hubert Marischka, 1947)
  (also director, 1948)
  (also director, 1945/1949)
  (also director, 1945/1949)
 Nothing But Coincidence (1949)
  (1949)
 Schuß um Mitternacht (1944/1950)
 Theodore the Goalkeeper (1950)
  (1950)
  (also director, 1944/1950)
 The Midnight Venus (1951)
 Hilfe, ich bin unsichtbar (1951)
  (also director, 1951)
 The Thief of Bagdad (1952)
 Shame on You, Brigitte! (1952)
 You Only Live Once (1952)
 Heidi (1952)
 Heute nacht passiert's (1953)
 The Postponed Wedding Night (1953)
 The Daughter of the Regiment (1953)
 Secretly Still and Quiet (1953)
 Hooray, It's a Boy! (1953)
 Räubergeschichte (1954, TV film)
 Heidi and Peter (1955)
 How Do I Become a Film Star? (also director, 1955)
 When the Alpine Roses Bloom  (1955)
  (also director, 1955)
 … und wer küßt mich? (1956)
 Ein tolles Hotel (1956)
 Das Liebesleben des schönen Franz (1956)
 Opera Ball (1956)
 My Aunt, Your Aunt (1956)
 The Model Husband (1956)
  (1956)
 August der Halbstarke (1957)
  (1957)
 The Schimeck Family (1957)
 Die Unschuld vom Lande (1957)
  (1957)
 Drei Mann auf einem Pferd (1957)
 Egon der Frauenheld (1957)
 The Legs of Dolores (1957)
 Almenrausch and Edelweiss (1957)
 Was ihr wollt (1958, TV film)
  (1958)
  A Song Goes Round the World (1958)
  (1958)
  (1958)
 Die gute Sieben (1959, TV film)
 The Night Before the Premiere (1959)
  (1959)
 The Goose of Sedan (1959)
 Pension Schöller (1960)
 Sie können's mir glauben (also director, 1960, TV film)
 A Woman for Life (1960)
  (1960)
 Die Kassette (1961, TV film)
  (1961)
 Schule der Gattinnen (also director, 1961, TV film)
 The Model Boy (1963)
 Das alte Hotel (1963, TV series, 6 episodes)
 Minna von Barnhelm (1964, TV film)
 Tonio Kröger (1964)
 Kolportage (1964, TV film)
 Don Juan oder Die Liebe zur Geometrie (1965, TV film)
  (1965)
 Schwarzer Peter (1966, TV film)
  (1967)
 The Heathens of Kummerow (1967)
 Der Vogelhändler (1968, TV film)
  (1968–1970, TV series, 13 episodes)
  (1968–1972, film series)
 Zur Hölle mit den Paukern (1968)
 Zum Teufel mit der Penne (1968)
  (1969)
 Hurra, die Schule brennt! (1969)
 We'll Take Care of the Teachers (1970)
 Morgen fällt die Schule aus (1971)
  (1972)
 Wenn die kleinen Veilchen blühen (1968, TV film)
 Was ihr wollt (1968, TV film)
 Königin einer Nacht (1969, TV film)
  (1969, TV film)
 Die Feuerzangenbowle (1970)
 Who Laughs Last, Laughs Best (1971)
 Aunt Trude from Buxtehude (1971)
  (1972)
  (1971)
 Ball im Savoy (1971, TV film)
 The Mad Aunts Strike Out (1971)
  (1972)
 Always Trouble with the Reverend (1972)
 So'n Theater (1973, TV film)
 Orpheus in der Unterwelt (1973, TV film)
 Die Powenzbande (1974, TV miniseries)
 Hochzeitsnacht im Paradies (1974, TV film)
  (1974, TV film)
 Im Hause des Kommerzienrates (1975, TV film)
  (1975, TV series, 13 episodes)
 Tristan (1975, TV film)
 Beschlossen und verkündet: Jean (1975, TV series episode)
 Damals wie heute (1975, TV film)
 The Secret Carrier (1975)
 : Die Klempner kommen (1976, TV series episode)
 Lady Dracula (1977)
 Pariser Geschichten: Der unbequeme Wasserträger (1977, TV series episode)
 Kleine Geschichten mit großen Tieren (1978, TV film)
 Zwei himmlische Töchter (1978, TV series, 2 episodes)
 Unsere heile Welt – Kleine Schule für große Leute (1980, TV series, 1 episode)

Short films
 Ins Blaue hinein (1929)
 Mein Name ist Lampe (1932)
 Nur ein Viertelstündchen (1932)
 Welle 4711 (1933)
 Meine Frau – seine Frau (1933)
 Wie werde ich energisch? (1933)
 Gutgehendes Geschäft zu verkaufen (1933)
 Die Goldgrube (1933)
 Schlagerpartie (1934)
 Die Abschieds-Symphonie (1934)
 Herr oder Diener (1934)
 Wie Eulenspiegel zu Marburg den Landgrafen malte (also director, 1936)
 Wie Eulenspiegel den Neunmalweisen Rede und Antwort steht (also director, 1936)
 Wie Eulenspiegel ein Urteil spricht (also director, 1936)
 Wie Eulenspiegel sich einmal erbot, zu fliegen (also director, 1936)
 Herbst (1968, TV film)

Films based on plays by Theo Lingen
 Was wird hier gespielt?, directed by Theo Lingen (1940, based on the play Was wird hier gespielt?)
 L'attore scomparso, directed by Luigi Zampa (1941, based on the play Was wird hier gespielt?)
 Johann, directed by Robert A. Stemmle (1943, based on the play Johann)

References

External links
 
 
 
 Theo Lingen at Virtual History

1903 births
1978 deaths
Deaths from cancer in Austria
German male stage actors
German male film actors
Film people from Hanover
German male silent film actors
Burials at the Vienna Central Cemetery
Actors from Hanover
20th-century German male actors
German male writers
Lingen family